Dream Doll is a 1979 British-Yugoslavian animated short film by Bob Godfrey and Zlatko Grgić as a co-production between Zagreb Film and Bob Godfrey Films. The authors shared similar art styles and animation philosophies such as using absurdist gags and disheveled drawings.

Plot
It is a film with erotic overtones in which a gentleman falls in love with a sex doll. The short ends with the man "born aloft by the flocks of dolls" as a deliberate parody of Disney's Peter Pan, Dream Doll is cited as one of Godfrey's most prominent works. although it also could be an homage to Albert Lamorisse's The Red Balloon.

Reception
The short was nominated for an Academy Award for Best Animated Short Film in 1980.

External links

References

1979 animated films
1979 short films
1979 films
1970s animated short films
Croatian animated short films
British animated short films
Yugoslav animated short films
Zagreb Film films
Films about dolls
1970s British films